Şıxzahırlı (also, Shikh-Zagerly, Shikh-Zagirli, Shikhzairly, and Shykhzairly) is a village and municipality in the Gobustan Rayon of Azerbaijan.  It has a population of 1,589.  The municipality consists of the villages of Şıxzahirli, Ceyrankeçməz, and Ilanlı.

References 

Populated places in Gobustan District